Synchronised swimming competitions at the 2015 European Games in Baku were held from 12 to 16 June, at the Baku Aquatics Centre.

Synchronised swimming was not included in the earliest list of sports confirmed for the 2015 Games, as the European swimming authorities at that stage were minded not to take part. However, following negotiations with the organising authorities, a compromise was reached whereby, in 2015, these events were for junior swimmers only - in effect, under 18 for women.

Medalists

Medal table

Participating nations 
A total of 150 athletes from 21 nations competed in Synchronised swimming at the 2015 European Games.

References

External links

 
Sports at the 2015 European Games
European Games
2015
Synchronised swimming in Azerbaijan